Caristiidae, the manefishes, are a family of perciform fishes which today includes 19 extant species distributed in four genera. Chalcidichthys malacapterygius and Absalomichthys velifer are extinct species from the Upper Miocene of Southern California.

Biography
They are deep-sea marine fishes that eat siphonophores. An adult manefish is less than 25 cm in length and most of them are entirely black, which helps camouflage them from predators.

Timeline

References

 
Ray-finned fish families